Peter Lebeck (died October 17, 1837, also Lebec or Lebecque) was an early settler of Kern County, California, of whom little is known, except that he was killed by a bear, probably a California grizzly, in 1837. The tree he was buried under is known as the Peter Lebeck Oak. He is attested only by his grave marker, now at Fort Tejon, but the mysterious circumstances of his identity and death have cemented his position in the culture of the San Joaquin Valley.

Biography

Lebeck may have been a Catholic French-Canadian trapper of the Hudson Bay Company -- judging by the Catholic-style Christogram seen on his grave -- granted by the Governor of California to hunt in the Tulare Valley. The only primary source for his life is the epitaph, reading:
 

The bear in question is likely a grizzly bear, as early Euro-American settlers in California referred to brown bears as "x bears" due to the pattern of dark fur on sometimes seen on their back.

William F. Edgar was told by Native Americans living at Fort Tejon that Lebeck, a trapper passing through the canyon went off by himself in pursuit of a large grizzly and shot it underneath the oak tree. Approaching it, the bear fatally mauled him. The visit was probably in 1893.

The grave of Lebeck and the inscription is mentioned, along with the carcass of a bear, in the diaries of three members of the Mormon Battalion, a group of volunteers who passed through the area in 1847. The journal of Robert S. Bliss, for July 31st 1847, reads

After the Mexican-American War, William Phipps Blake, accompanying the party of Robert S. Williamson, made note of the monument and an "unusual number of grizzly bears" in 1853, writing that it was a "durable monument." William Ingraham Kip noticed the bark was beginning to cover the epitaph in 1855. By the time John Xantus was living at Fort Tejon, between 1857 and 1859, the inscription had been covered by new bark.

Popular interest in the gravesite

In 1890, an informal group from Bakersfield, called the Foxtail Rangers, removed the bark in the late 19th century with the permission of Edward Fitzgerald Beale and rediscovered the inscription in reverse on its underside. Four feet under the surface, they exhumed a skeleton "nearly six feet long, and broad in proportion" with "a remarkable state of preservation." The body was laid east-west, with the left arm folded over the breast. The right forearm, both feet, and the left hand were missing. Two ribs on the left side were broken.

The removed bark was initially in the possession of the local sheriff. In 1904, Truxtun Beale, Edward's son, sued in the Superior Court for possession of the epitaph.

A number of apocryphal works have sprung up around the personage, including that Lebec was an Acadian Frenchman sent by the Republic of Texas, or that he was a Lieutenant of Engineers named Pierre Lebecque in the French Army who was present with Napoleon on Elba. In 1915, a five franc coin, dated 1837, was found in the ruins of an adobe hospital by Sam Allen, an employee of Tejon Ranch, fueling legends that he was connected to the French government.

Legacy
A new headstone was dedicated on April 15, 1936. E Clampus Vitus dedicated a plaque on the site on October 14th, 1972. Further, the Kern County division of E Clampus Vitus is named Peter Lebeck Chapter #1866. Mary Hunter Austin's novel Isidro, published serially in The Atlantic, features a Peter Lebecque, who lives in a hut in Cañada de las Uvas. He is killed by a bear and buried under an oak in Tejon Pass. Austin also describes Lebeck and the Lebeck Oak in The Flock. San Joaquin poet Don Thompson writes of Lebeck in his collection Local Color. The town of Lebec, California is named for him.

See also

 List of fatal bear attacks in North America
 Isaac Slover
 John "Grizzly" Adams

Notes

References

External links
 Peter Lebeck Historical Marker
 Bark Inscription, Lebeck Oak
 Peter Lebeck

1837 deaths
Year of birth unknown
Explorers of California
History of Kern County, California
Individual trees in California